The 2009–10 season saw Swindon Town FC, managed by Danny Wilson, finish in fifth place and reach the League one play-off final where they were ultimately beaten by Millwall FC.

Pre-season

For the third consecutive year, Swindon Town ventured to Austria for pre-season training. This was manager Danny Wilson's first summer as Swindon manager as he took over in late December 2008, replacing Maurice Malpas.

15 players from the previous season, including influential forward Simon Cox, had either been released by Wilson or in the case of Cox sold. Trialist Cherno Samba joined Town during the trip.

The rest of the summer consisted of Town playing against familiar opposition such as Wiltshire outfits Chippenham Town and Swindon Supermarine. Championship club Cardiff City, West Bromwich Albion and Plymouth Argyle were named as Town's home opposition.

Trial players who featured for Swindon Town during Pre-Season

 Cherno Samba: Once a highly rated forward, Samba joined Town for the Pre-Season work out in Austria. He failed to score in four fixtures.
 Anton Ademol: An unknown midfielder played against Hungerford Town and Chippenham Town. He failed to earn a deal.
 Stephen Morrison: Former Everton youth midfielder played against Hungerford Town and scored. Danny Wilson gave him a second chance at Chippenham Town but failed to earn a contract.
 Scott Spencer: Former Everton forward who scored against Hungerford Town. He failed to earn a contract at Swindon but later joined Southend United where he scored a late goal against Swindon during the season.
 Berlin Ndebe-Nlome: The former Cameroon youth forward played in the high profile friendlies against Cardiff City and West Bromwich Albion but failed to impress.
 Yan Klukowski: A Wiltshire native who forged a decent reputation with the American College leagues. He finished the Pre-Season as Town's top scorer with 3 goals in 3 games for Swindon. Despite impressing, he failed to win a contract.
 Bradley Clark: The Hungerford Town forward impressed the Town coaches and was offered a trial.
 Panikos Efythmides: Greek midfielder who played the final two Town friendlies.
 Dean McDonald: Former Ipswich Town forward who played in Town's final friendly of Pre-Season against Cirencester Town. McDonald scored but did not earn a Town deal. He later joined Farnborough.

League One

League One Playoffs

F.A. Cup

After losing the First Round to Non-League Histon last season - Town were once again given the task of meeting Non-League Woking a year on. Despite a less than convincing display, Billy Paynter's first half goal was enough. The Second Round saw Swindon beat Wrexham in Wales a couple of weeks later, Gordon Greer scored the only goal ten minutes time.

Town were knocked out of the competition in the Third Round to Premier League outfit Fulham, Bobby Zamora scoring for the Cottagers.

League Cup

Swindon Town entered the League Cup in the First Round and were drawn to play Milton Keynes Dons. Swindon had recently lost 5–0 at Gillingham on the opening day of the league season. Town beat the Dons comfortably at Stadium:MK by four goals to one.

Town's next game was away from Wiltshire against Premier League outfit Wolverhampton Wanderers. Wolves manager Mick McCarthy fielded an under strength team but did enough to beat Swindon Town 6–5 in a penalty shoot-out after 120 minutes of football without a goal. Swindon Town captain Gordon Greer missed the only penalty.

 Wolverhampton Wanderers won 6–5 on penalties.

Football League Trophy

Swindon Town were drawn to play Exeter City at St James Park where a late Stuart Fleetwood strike cancelled out Anthony McNamee's goal in the first half. The game won by Swindon 5–3 on penalties with Phil Smith saving two of the spot kicks.

Swindon were knocked out in the next round by Norwich City, penalty kicks settled the tie again - the only missed penalty was taken by Craig Easton.

 Swindon Town beat Exeter City 4–3 on penalties
 Norwich City beat Swindon Town 5–3 on penalties

Squad statistics

Swindon Town 2009/10

References

Swindon Town F.C. seasons
Swindon Town